Exposition Universelle et Internationale de Liège was a world's fair held in Liège from 27 April to 6 November 1905 just 8 years after a Belgian exposition held in Brussels. Intended to show Liège's industrial importance it also marked 75 years of Belgian independence and 40 years of Leopold II's reign.

The exposition received 7 million visitors, covered 52 acres and made 75,117 Belgian Francs.

Participants and exhibits

Twenty-nine countries were official participants, from Europe: Austria, Bulgaria, Denmark, France, Greece, Hungary, Italy, Luxembourg, Montenegro, Norway, Netherlands, Portugal, Romania, Russia, Serbia, Sweden, Switzerland, and the United Kingdom; from Africa: Egypt and Congo Free State; from America: Argentina, Brazil, Canada, Cuba, and the United States; and from Asia China, Japan, Persia and Turkey. Germany and Spain were unofficial participants

There was an exhibition of medieval and Renaissance art, L'art ancien au Pays de Liège, as part of the event. Ulrikke Greve' Nordenfjeldske Kunstindustrimuseums Vævskole contributed tapestries which won a gold prize.

Legacy
The Palais des Beaux Arts building was left to the city, and housed the Musee d'Art Moderne et d'Art Contemporaine. After closing in 2013, in May 2016 it reopened, with a contemporary glass extension, as La Boverie.

Music
A piece by Jean-Théodore Radoux entitled Cantate pour l'inauguration de l'Exposition universelle de Liège, 1905, with words by Jules Sauvenière, was written for the expo.

See also
 Colonial exhibition
 The Walloon Movement

External links
Official website of the BIE 
 A poster advertising France's involvement in the exhibition

References

World's fairs in Liège
1905 in Belgium
History of Liège
Culture in Liège